Gregory John Luke Cooper (born 10 June 1965) is a New Zealand rugby union former player and current coach. He was a member of the New Zealand national side, the All Blacks, in 1986 and 1992, and played seven matches, all of them tests, for the team.  he holds the record for the most points scored for Otago.

Cooper was appointed coach of the Otago team for the 2003 and 2004 seasons.

References

1965 births
Living people
Rugby union players from Gisborne, New Zealand
New Zealand rugby union players
New Zealand rugby union coaches
New Zealand international rugby union players
Hawke's Bay rugby union players
Otago rugby union players
Auckland rugby union players
Blues (Super Rugby) players
Rugby union fullbacks
People educated at St John's College, Hastings